Valentin Vasilyevich Orishchenko (born 10 July 1922) was a Soviet sprint canoer who competed in the early 1950s. Together with Nikolay Perevozchikov he finished fourth in the C-2 10000 m event at the 1952 Summer Olympics in Helsinki. Orishchenko was a World War II veteran. Before taking up canoe racing he trained in gymnastics.

References

1922 births
Possibly living people
Canoeists at the 1952 Summer Olympics
Olympic canoeists of the Soviet Union
Soviet male canoeists